Pachman is a surname. Notable people with the surname include:

Luděk Pachman (1924–2003), Czechoslovak-German chess grandmaster and activist
Vladimir de Pachmann (1848–1933), pianist of Russian-German ethnicity

See also
Pakman